Richard Sele (born 31 August 1989) is a New Caledonian professional football player who plays for AS Magenta.

International career

International goals
Scores and results list New Caledonia's goal tally first.

References

1989 births
Living people
New Caledonian footballers
New Caledonia international footballers
Association football forwards
AS Lössi players
AS Fabrègues players